War & Society is an international scholarly journal focused on warfare and society. It is published quarterly in England by Taylor & Francis since 1984.  It is edited by the School of Humanities and Social Sciences at the University of New South Wales, Canberra  by Associate Professor Eleanor Hancock.  Seven historians from the United States and the United Kingdom make up the editorial board. It is indexed by major services; Print ISSN: 0729-2473 Online ISSN: 2042-4345.  Its "impact factor" in 2018 was 0.219.

A finding aid to the papers of War & Society
is available at UNSW Canberra.

Notes

Military history journals
Publications established in 1984
English-language journals
Quarterly journals
Taylor & Francis academic journals